Melvin Alberto Cartagena Portillo (born 30 July 1999) is a Salvadoran professional footballer who plays as a midfielder for Primera División club Águila and the El Salvador national team.

International career
Cartagena made his debut with the El Salvador national team in a 4–0 2022 FIFA World Cup qualification win over St Kitts and Nevis on 12 June 2021.

References

External links
 
 

1999 births
Living people
Sportspeople from Santa Ana, El Salvador
Salvadoran footballers
El Salvador international footballers
El Salvador youth international footballers
Association football midfielders
C.D. FAS footballers
Salvadoran Primera División players